The Kishima Group is a group of palaeontological geological formations located in Japan.

It dates to the Upper Eocene—Lower Oligocene epochs of the Paleogene Period, in the Cenozoic Era.

The formations of the Kishima Group are:
 Daimyoji Formation
 Funazu Formation
 Itanoura Formation
 Kakinoura Formation
 Kishima Formation
 Magome Formation
 Matsushima Formation
 Okinoshima Formation
 Oshima Formation

See also 
 List of fossil sites

Further reading 
  (1993); Wildlife of Gondwana. Reed. 

Geologic groups of Asia
Geologic formations of Japan
Paleogene System of Asia
Paleogene Japan
Eocene Series
Oligocene Series
Oligocene paleontological sites
Paleontology in Japan